Stephen Chenault is a game designer who has worked primarily on role-playing games.  He is also the co-founder and CEO of Troll Lord Games.

Career
Stephen Chenault and his brother Davis Chenault wanted to publish a 300-page leather bound campaign setting. When Stephen learned that Mac Golden was thinking of publishing a gaming magazine called The Seeker, they formed Troll Lord Games in 1999 with Davis Chenault. They then published a set of "universal" adventures, and they prepared three of them for Gen Con 33: After Winter's Dark (2000), a 24-page book describing the campaign setting of Erde; The Mortality of Green (2000), an Erde adventure; Vakhund: Into the Unknown (2000), an adventure for the campaign setting of Inzae and also the first part of a trilogy. Stephen Chenault authored A Lion in the Ropes (2001), a d20 mystery and the first d20 adventure from Troll Lord Games.

The Chenaults also published their campaign setting in the Codex of Erde (2001), although it was not quite 200 pages and not leather-bound. Gary Gygax wrote to the Chenaults to thank them for their gift of Troll Lord's first RPG supplements at Gen Con 33, and their conversation eventually led to Gygax offering to write books for Troll Lord.

When Troll Lord Games published their Castles & Crusades role-playing game, the Chenaults reprinted some of their classics, such as I1: Vakhund: Into the Unknown (2006). When Gygax died in 2008, Troll Lord Games lost the licenses to all of his works, but the Chenaults continue to remember his legacy and his part in the success of their company with a memorial on their main web page.

References

External links
 

Living people
Role-playing game designers
Year of birth missing (living people)